The County Line Bowstring is a bridge located near unincorporated Hollis, Kansas, United States, that is listed on the National Register of Historic Places. It spans West Creek on the border between Cloud and Republic counties and has a wooden deck with a bowstring pony truss.

The span was built in 1876 by the Wrought Iron Bridge Co. of Ohio, as one of four spans in a bridge crossing in Concordia, Kansas.  Later the four spans were removed to different locations in the area.  It crosses West Creek, a tributary to the Republican River.

As of 2010, the bridge is open to one-lane automobile traffic on a low-maintenance county road.

See also
 National Register of Historic Places listings in Cloud County, Kansas
 National Register of Historic Places listings in Republic County, Kansas

References

 Historic Bridges of the United States (with photos and map) http://bridgehunter.com/ks/cloud/county-line/

Buildings and structures in Cloud County, Kansas
Buildings and structures in Republic County, Kansas
Bridges completed in 1876
Road bridges on the National Register of Historic Places in Kansas
Tourist attractions in Cloud County, Kansas
National Register of Historic Places in Republic County, Kansas
Wrought iron bridges in the United States
Bowstring truss bridges in the United States
Girder bridges in the United States